The 2003 Arena Football League season was the 17th season of the Arena Football League. It was succeeded by 2004. The league champions were the Tampa Bay Storm, who defeated the Arizona Rattlers in ArenaBowl XVII. The AFL expanded its season from 14 games to 16 games.

Standings

 Green indicates clinched playoff berth
 Purple indicates division champion
 Grey indicates best regular season record

Playoffs
All games televised by NBC.

All-Arena team